Aeschynite may refer to:

Aeschynite-(Ce)
Aeschynite-(Nd)
Aeschynite-(Y)